Anisur Rahman Sarkar is an Indian Bengali politician and was a Minister for Panchayat and Rural Development in the Left Front Ministry in the Indian state of West Bengal. He was elected on a CPI(M) ticket from the Domkal Vidhan Sabha constituency in 1991, 1996, 2001, 2006, 2011 and 2016.

He has done an M.A. and B.Ed. He was a retired headmaster.

References

Living people
West Bengal MLAs 1991–1996
West Bengal MLAs 1996–2001
West Bengal MLAs 2001–2006
West Bengal MLAs 2006–2011
West Bengal MLAs 2011–2016
West Bengal MLAs 2016–2021
Communist Party of India (Marxist) politicians from West Bengal
People from Murshidabad district
State cabinet ministers of West Bengal
1952 births
20th-century Bengalis
21st-century Bengalis